El Karimia District is a district of Chlef Province, Algeria.

Communes 
The district is further divided into 3 communes:

 El Karimia
 Harchoun 
 Beni Bouateb.

References 

Districts of Chlef Province